Lei Tingjie (born 13 March 1997) is a Chinese chess grandmaster. She won the Women's Chinese Chess Championship in 2017.

Career
In 2014, Lei won the 4th China Women Masters Tournament in Wuxi on tie-break from Ju Wenjun and was awarded the title of Woman Grandmaster (WGM) by FIDE. In 2015, she won the women's open event of the Moscow Open, ahead of World Junior Girls Champion Aleksandra Goryachkina. Lei competed in the Women's World Chess Championship 2015, where she was knocked out in the second round by top seed Humpy Koneru. In December 2015, Lei tied for 1st–5th with Alexander Zubarev, Olexandr Bortnyk, Jure Skoberne and Maximilian Neef in the 32nd Böblingen International Open scoring 7/9 points.

In 2016, she played on the gold medal-winning Chinese team in the women's event of the Asian Nations Cup in Dubai. She was awarded the full Grandmaster title in March 2017. In June, Lei won the 6th Chinese Women's Masters Tournament in Wuxi, ahead of Women's World Champion Tan Zhongyi. In December, Lei took the silver medal in the Women's World Rapid Chess Championship in Riyadh.

In January 2018,  Lei won the 43rd Sevilla International Chess Open.

She won the FIDE Women's Grand Swiss Tournament 2021 and secured a spot in the Women's Candidates Tournament 2022–23.

References

External links 

Lei Tingjie chess games at 365Chess.com

Lei Tingjie team chess record at Olimpbase.org

1997 births
Living people
Chess grandmasters
Female chess grandmasters
Chess woman grandmasters
Chinese female chess players
Chess players from Chongqing